The 1978 Croydon Council election took place on 4 May 1978 to elect members of Croydon London Borough Council in London, England. The whole council was up for election and the Conservative party stayed in overall control of the council.

Background
This was the first election to Croydon Council since 1974. This was the first election fought on new boundaries, and the first without Aldermen, increasing the total number of Councillors from 60 to 70.

Election result

Ward results

Addiscombe

Ashburton

Bensham Manor

Beulah

Broad Green

Coulsdon East

Croham

Fairfield

Fieldway

Heathfield

Kenley

Monks Orchard

New Addington

Norbury

Purley

Rylands

Sanderstead

Selsdon

South Norwood

Spring Park

Thornton Heath

Upper Norwood

Waddon

West Thornton

Whitehorse Manor

Woodcote & Coulsdon West

Woodside

References

1978
1978 London Borough council elections